The Greece–Turkey football rivalry is one of Europe's major rivalries between two national teams, Greece and Turkey.

History

Greece and Turkey have long-standing tensions throughout history.

The Ottoman Empire conquered most of Greece gradually in the 15th century. The Greek War of Independence broke out in 1821, overthrowing the Ottoman rule and became the first Balkan and European nation to set free themselves from the Turks. By that time, the Greek identity was soon strengthened and a number of conflicts occurred between Turkey and Greece existed from the 1830s onward.

In 1919, with the collapse of the Ottoman state, Greece attempted to conquer Western Turkey, in their accordance to the Megali Idea, and both the Greeks and Turks caused atrocities on each other. Greeks ended up defeated by the Turks and were expelled back to Greece. Efforts from Mustafa Kemal Atatürk and Eleftherios Venizelos helped establish official relations between Greece and Turkey. The grievance, however, returned with the Cyprus dispute, and the division of the island into a northern Turkish part and southern Greek part.

Due to historical grievances, Greece and Turkey have a heated rivalry, though less violent than Greece or Turkey's other rivalries. Both teams are also described as "punching above their weights", due to their successes despite lack of competitive history in football. Despite up-and-down in relations, so far, both Turkey and Greece only played one match in a neutral ground.

List of matches

See also
Greece–Turkey relations

References

Turkey national football team
Greece national football team
International association football rivalries
Greece–Turkey relations